The Székely Autonomy Day is a day celebrated by the Székely (Hungarian) minority of Romania. It is celebrated every last Sunday of October. On it, candles, torches and fires are lit on Székely cities, villages and settlements to demand the autonomy of Székely Land within Romania.

The Székely Autonomy Day was first celebrated on 2015. The next year, the Szekler National Council announced that the day would be celebrated on every last Sunday of October. The holiday has also been celebrated in Hungary.

See also
Public holidays in Romania
Székely Freedom Day
Hungarians in Romania

References

Day
Day
Day
Annual events in Romania
Autumn events in Romania
Observances in Romania
October observances
Public holidays in Romania
2015 establishments in Romania